Dana Jayne Shrader (born July 10, 1956) is an American Olympian former competition swimmer.

Shrader represented the United States as a 16-year-old at the 1972 Summer Olympics in Munich, Germany.  She swam the butterfly leg for the gold medal-winning U.S. team in the preliminary heats of the women's 4×100-meter medley relay, but was ineligible to receive a medal under the 1972 rules because she did not swim in the event final.  Individually, she also competed in the women's 100-meter butterfly and finished fifth in the final with a time of 1:03.98. All 5 top finishers broke the world and Olympic record.

See also
 List of Olympic medalists in swimming (women)
 List of University of Arizona people

References

1956 births
Living people
American female butterfly swimmers
Arizona Wildcats women's swimmers
Olympic swimmers of the United States
People from Lynwood, California
Swimmers at the 1972 Summer Olympics